Arnot's chat (Myrmecocichla arnotti), also known as the white-headed black-chat, is a species of bird in the chat and flycatcher family Muscicapidae. The species is found in southern Africa from Rwanda and Angola to South Africa.

Taxonomy
The species was described by Henry Baker Tristram in 1869 based upon a specimen collected at Victoria Falls in modern-day Zimbabwe, as Saxicola arnotti. Tristram wrote that he named the species after the collector, a Mr. Arnott, but the man was actually named David Arnot. For this reason, it was suggested in 1965 that the name should be spelled arnoti instead. However, since there is no evidence in Tristram's original paper that the name was misspelled, the rules of the International Code of Zoological Nomenclature mandate that the spelling arnotti be maintained.

Along with the white-fronted black-chat this species is sometimes separated into the genus Pentholaea. The species contains two subspecies, hartertii, which is found in Angola, and the nominate, which is found across the rest of its range. A third subspecies, collariis, is now usually considered a separate species, the Ruaha chat. This species is indistinguishable from Arnot's chat in male birds but has different plumage in females, a difference that has mostly been overlooked for over a century.

Habitat
Arnot's chat is most commonly found in healthy stands of miombo and mopane woodland. It also occurs at lower densities in other kinds of open woodland with little herbaceous cover, and very rarely near buildings. The species is generally not migratory, but is presumed to undertake some localized wandering.

Description

The plumage of the adults is sexually dimorphic; the male of the nominate race is overall black with a white crown and a white patch on the wing coverts. The female is similar but with a black crown and a white (tipped with black) throat and neck. The bill and legs are black. Juvenile birds are like the adults but with white feather tips on the crown or throat instead of fuller white. The male of the race harterti has less extensive white on the wings and a mostly black head with a small area of white on the forehead and above the eye; the white throat of the female is also less extensive than on the nominate.

References

Arnot's chat
Birds of Southern Africa
Arnot's chat
Taxonomy articles created by Polbot